The 2017–18 Deodhar Trophy was the 45th edition of the Deodhar Trophy, a List A cricket competition in India. It was contested between Karnataka, the winner of the 2017–18 Vijay Hazare Trophy and two other teams selected by the Board of Control for Cricket in India (BCCI). It was played from 4 to 8 March 2018. India B defeated Karnataka in the final by 6 wickets to win the trophy.

Squads 

Ravichandran Ashwin was ruled out ahead of the series due to injury. He was replaced by Shahbaz Nadeem. Ankit Bawne was appointed as captain of the India A squad. Bawne was originally in the India B squad; Akshdeep Nath was moved to the India B squad from the India A squad to facilitate the change.

Group stage

Points table

Matches

Final

References

External links
 Series home at ESPNCricinfo

2018 in Indian cricket
Professional 50-over cricket competitions
Deodhar Trophy